This list of 20th-century earthquakes is a global list of notable earthquakes that occurred in the 20th century. After 1900 most earthquakes have some degree of instrumental records and this means that the locations and magnitudes are more reliable than for earlier events. To prevent this list becoming unmanageable, only those of magnitude 6 and above are included unless they are notable for some other reason.

List of deadliest earthquakes

List of largest earthquakes by magnitude

 Note: At least 8.5+ magnitude

1901–1910

1911–1920

1921–1930

1931–1940

1941–1950

1951–1960

1961–1970

1971–1980

1981–1990

1991–2000

Key to magnitudes
ML = Local magnitude (Richter)
MS = Surface wave magnitude
Mw = Moment magnitude

See also
Lists of earthquakes

References

 
 
Earthquakes
Seismic history
Seismology related lists